The Calgary Dinos women's basketball team represent the University of Calgary in the Canada West Universities Athletic Association of U Sports women's basketball. In 1989, the Dinos captured the Bronze Baby, awarded to the U Sports National Champions.

History
Starting on October 28, 1988, the Dinos enjoyed a superlative 69-game winning streak. Coming to an end on March 10, 1990, the stretch was highlighted by an undefeated 1988-89 season, which saw the program capture the Bronze Baby trophy. During the 1990-91 season, Jodi Evans led Canada West in points, assists, and rebounds, earning the Nan Copp Award for her efforts.

On February 11, 2012, which was also Senior Night for the Dinos, fifth-year player Jenna Kaye became the first player in program history to achieve a triple-double. Versus the Winnipeg Wesmen, Kaye recorded 10 points, 14 rebounds and 13 assists in an 88-62 victory.

All-Time Coaches
Pat Dewar
Dr. Jean Leiper
Theresa Maxwell (1972-75)
Marilyn McNeil (1975-79)
Donna Rudakas (1979-90, 1991-94)
Jane Anne Smith (1990-91)
Shawnee Harle (1994-2012)
Damian Jennings (2012-present)

Individual Leader Scoring

Season by season record

All-time records

Scoring

U Sports Elite 8 results

Awards and honors
2001 Lieutenant Governor Athletic Awards: Leighann Doan

Canada West Hall of Fame
Class of 2021 Inductee: Jodi Evans
Class of 2020 Inductee: Leighann Reimer 
Class of 2019 Inductee: Theresa Maxwell

U Sports Awards
2004-05 Tracy MacLeod Award (Perseverance): Cory Bekkering
2001-02 Tracy MacLeod Award (Perseverance): Debra Hidson
1996-97 Kathy Shields Award (Rookie of the year): Leighann Doan

Nan Copp Award
Awarded to the U Sports Player of the year
2000-01 Leighann Doan, Calgary
1999-00 Leighann Doan, Calgary
1990-91 Jodi Evans, Calgary
1989-90 Veronica VanderSchee, Calgary
1987-88 Veronica VanderSchee, Calgary
1980-81 Janis Paskevich, Calgary

Peter Ennis Award
Awarded to the Coach of the Year
1989-90 Donna Rudakas
1988-89 Donna Rudakas
1978-79 Marilyn McNeil

U Sports Nationals
1988-89 U Sports championship MVP: Veronica VanderSchee

Player of the Game
2020 U Sports Consolation Final - Liene Staldazine: Calgary

Top 100
In celebration of the centennial anniversary of U SPORTS women’s basketball, a committee of U SPORTS women’s basketball coaches and partners revealed a list of the Top 100 women's basketball players. Commemorating the 100th anniversary of the first Canadian university women’s contest between the Queen’s Gaels and McGill Martlets on Feb. 6, 1920, the list of the Top 100 was gradually revealed over four weeks. The list would feature 7 Dinos alumnae.

International
Kelly Boucher  Basketball at the 1996 Summer Olympics, Basketball at the 2000 Summer Olympics
Jodi Evans	 Basketball at the 1996 Summer Olympics
Erin McIntosh:  2019 Winter Universiade

References 

Calgary Dinos
U Sports women's basketball teams
Sports teams in Calgary
Women in Alberta